Miles (or Relius) Phifer and Robert Crosky were lynched in Montgomery, Alabama for allegedly assaulting a white woman.

Lynching of Phifer and Crosky

In August or September 1919 Miles Phifer and Robert Crosky were arrested over allegations they assaulted two white women in separate incidents in Montgomery, Alabama. The Gadsden Daily Times-News reported that the two had confessed to the assaults. A mob had formed and a concerned citizen notified Alabama's Governor Thomas Kilby that there might be a lynching. Kilby ordered the two to be transferred to the relative safety of prison in Wetumpka, Alabama. On September 29, 1919, the sheriff and his deputies were transporting Phifer and Crosky when they were stopped by a white mob, of about 25 masked men.  The deputies stood by as the men pulled the two out of the car. They were taken into the wilderness  out of Montgomery, Alabama and told to run. As Phifer and Crosky sprinted away from the mob they were gunned down. Croskey was instantly killed, but Phifer lived for a few hours.  Phifer and Crosky were discharged soldiers and Phifer was still in his uniform when he was killed.

Lynching of John Temple

On 2 AM on September 30, 1919, a day after the lynching of Phifer and Crosky, John Temple was lynched in a hospital for allegedly fatally wounding Policeman Barbaree. The two events were not linked.

Aftermath

These lynchings were one of several incidents of civil unrest that are now known as the American Red Summer of 1919. Attacks on black communities and white oppression spread to more than three dozen cities and counties. In most cases, white mobs attacked African American neighborhoods. In some cases, black community groups resisted the attacks, especially in Chicago and Washington, D.C. Most deaths occurred in rural areas during events like the Elaine race riot in Arkansas, where an estimated 100 to 240 blacks and 5 whites were killed. Other major events of Red Summer were the Chicago race riot and Washington D.C. Race Riot, which caused 38 and 39 deaths, respectively. Both riots had many more non-fatal injuries and extensive property damage reaching up into the millions of dollars.

Lynchings in Alabama during 1919

See also

African American veterans lynched after WWI
Washington race riot of 1919
Mass racial violence in the United States
List of incidents of civil unrest in the United States

Bibliography
Notes

References 

   
 - Total pages: 452 

1919 in Alabama
1919 in military history
1919 riots in the United States
1919 murders in the United States
September 1919 events  
African-American history between emancipation and the civil rights movement
Lynching deaths in Alabama
Racially motivated violence against African Americans
Red Summer
Riots and civil disorder in Alabama
White American riots in the United States